Manifesto is the sixth studio album by English rock band Roxy Music. It was released in March 1979 by E.G. in the United Kingdom, Polydor in Europe and Atco in the United States.

Following an almost four-year recording hiatus, Manifesto was Roxy Music's first studio album since 1975's Siren. The first single from Manifesto was "Trash", which peaked at number 40 on the UK Singles Chart. The second single, the disco-tinged "Dance Away", was more successful, peaking at number two in the UK on 26 May 1979, beaten to the top spot for three weeks by Blondie's "Sunday Girl". It became one of the band's biggest hits, and was also the ninth best-selling single in the UK in 1979. The song was also released as a 12" extended version (running at six and half minutes), a format that had started to become popular in the late 1970s. The third single from the album was a re-recorded version of "Angel Eyes", which was far more electronic and "disco" in nature than the power-pop album version. An extended 12" mix was also released. The single also made the UK top five, peaking at number four in August. The album itself peaked at number seven on the UK Albums Chart. In the United States, the album peaked at number 23 on the Billboard 200, making it Roxy Music's highest-charting album in the US.

The cover design which featured a variety of mannequins (a concept also used for the covers of the singles from the album), was created by Bryan Ferry with fashion designer Antony Price and American TV actress Hilary Thompson amongst others. The picture disc version of the album featured a version of the design in which the mannequins are unclothed. The cover's typography, as well as the album's title, were inspired by the first edition of Wyndham Lewis's literary magazine Blast.

Release history 
On the original vinyl release, side one was labelled "East Side" and side two was labelled "West Side".

After the song became a hit, the second pressings of the album substituted the original version of "Dance Away" with its single remix. Later on, the LP version of "Angel Eyes" was also replaced by the more popular re-recorded version released as a single. The original CD versions of the album used the revised track list, until the LP version of "Angel Eyes" was restored in the 1999 remaster. Manifesto was finally released on CD in its original version on The Complete Studio Recordings box in 2012. The first LP version ‘Angel Eyes’ first appeared on the U.S. compilation CD “The Atlantic Collection” while the first LP version of “Dance Away” appeared on CD for the first time in 1995 on The Thrill of It All box set.

Critical reception 

Manifesto was positively received by critics but not as well regarded as previous Roxy Music albums. In his review for Melody Maker, Richard Williams stated:

Max Bell of NME gave it a lukewarm review:

Similarly, Village Voice critic Robert Christgau wrote: 

Greil Marcus wrote in Rolling Stone:

It was ranked 30th in The Village Voice Pazz & Jop critics' poll of the best albums of 1979. The 1992 Rolling Stone Album Guide gave the album four stars and says "the regrouped Roxy seems better for the rest: deftly blending fresh rhythms into its signature sound, shortening the musical passages and concentrating more on song craft.

Track listing

Personnel 
Roxy Music
 Bryan Ferry - vocals, keyboards, harmonica
 Andy Mackay - oboe, saxophone
 Phil Manzanera - guitar
 Paul Thompson - drums

Additional personnel
 Alan Spenner - bass
 Gary Tibbs - bass
 Paul Carrack - keyboards

Uncredited personnel
 Steve Ferrone – drums 
 Rick Marotta – drums 
 Richard Tee – piano 
 Melissa Manchester – backing vocals

Technical personnel
 Rhett Davies – recording engineer
 Jimmy Douglass – engineer
 Phill Brown – engineer
 Randy Mason – engineer

Charts

Weekly charts

Year-end charts

Certifications

Notes 

1979 albums
Roxy Music albums
E.G. Records albums
Polydor Records albums
Atco Records albums
Reprise Records albums
Virgin Records albums